Hearts in Dixie (1929) starring Stepin Fetchit was one of the first all-"talkie", big-studio productions to boast a predominantly African-American cast.  A musical, the film celebrates African-American music and dance.  It was released by Fox Film Corporation just months before the release of Hallelujah!, another all-black musical by competitor Metro-Goldwyn-Mayer.  The director of Hearts in Dixie was Paul Sloane.  Walter Weems wrote the screenplay, and William Fox was producer.

Synopsis
There is no overarching storyline. The film is a series of unconnected scenes celebrating the advent of sound  technology in the context of "black music". 
Hearts in Dixie unfolds as a series of sketches of life among American blacks. Although the characters are not slaves they are nevertheless racial stereotypes in terms of the contemporary white images of the period.

One plot focuses on Grandfather Nappus (Clarence Muse), his daughter, Chloe (Bernice Pilot), her young son, Chinaquapin (Eugene Jackson), and her husband, Gummy (Stepin Fetchit). In order to make certain that his grandson Chinaquapin does not end up like his father or become tainted by the superstitions that dominate the community, the grandfather decides to send the boy away. One particularly tender scene shows Nappus's love for his grandson, whom he sends North for schooling. The film ends with the youngster's departure aboard a riverboat.

Cast
Stepin Fetchit: Gummy
Clarence Muse: Nappus
Eugene Jackson: Chinquapin
Bernice Pilot: Chloe
Clifford Ingram: Rammey
Mildred Washington: Trallia
Zack Williams: Deacon
Gertrude Howard: Emmy
Dorothy Morrison: Melia
Vivian Smith: Violet
A.C.H. Bilbrew: Voodoo Woman
Richard Carlyle: White Doctor
The Billbrew Chorus

References

External links
 
 
 

1929 films
1920s musical drama films
American musical drama films
American black-and-white films
Fox Film films
1929 drama films
Films directed by Paul Sloane
1920s English-language films
1920s American films